Makar Mykhaylovych Honcharenko, (April 5, 1912, Kiev, Russian Empire – April 1, 1997, Kyiv, Ukraine) was a Soviet-Ukrainian football player and coach. During his career, he played as a forward for a number of clubs, but most noticeably for Dynamo Kyiv.

Biography 

Honcharenko was born in a poor working family. In order to help his family, he had to repair footwear early in his childhood. All his free time was dedicated to football.

His career started in 1929. when he started playing for a junior football team of the factory Kommunalnik. Then he played for a Dombalya tram factory team. After that he moved to ZhelDor, where he became a first choice player in 1931.

In the autumn of 1934 Sergey Bartminskiy, the former deputy of the Ukrainian SSR State Political Directorate forced Honcharenko to move to Ivanovo where he started playing for the local Dynamo. On the 3rd of August 1933 he participated in a match between Dynamo and Turkey national team. His team won 7-3. In the same year he played for RSFSR team and was named one of the best 33 football players in USSR and the second best right winger.

In 1934 he returned to Kyiv and started playing for Dynamo Kyiv. In 1935 he played for Kyiv city team in the USSR championship. After that he was called to the Ukrainian SSR team.

He played a football player in a film called The Goalkeeper, which was shot in 1936.

1938 was the best year of his career. Honcharenko was awarded The Best Scorer of the USSR football championship after he scored 19 goals in 24 matches, but was excluded from The best 33 USSR football players.

The season 1939 was a failure - Honcharenko played in 23 games and scored only twice. After this season he left Dynamo for Lokomotiv Kyiv. In 1941 he moved to Spartak Odessa. He was able to play in only three times before the war came.

During the Nazi occupation of Kyiv he lived with his mother-in-law and was a member of a sport society Rukh. The members of Rukh were loyal to the new civil administration, which made it possible to work legally, receive rations, and, most importantly, to avoid being arrested and sent to Germany.

Soon he was found by Nikolai Trusevich and was offered a workplace at the bakery #1, where he was able to play for a factory football team Start Kyiv.

In June 1942 Start was allowed to organise friendly games in Kyiv. Honcharenko was a part of the game that later by the Soviet propaganda called it as Death Match. Some time after he was arrested. First, he was held in a solitary confinement by the Gestapo, then, in September 1942 he was transferred to Syrets concentration camp. There along with M. Sviridovskiy he was repairing boots for German soldiers.

In September 1943 he escaped from the camp and returned home, where his neighbours helped him to hide.

After the war he was inspected by NKVD and was allowed to join Dynamo Kyiv.

In 1946 he played for Pischevik Odessa for one year, then he moved to Spartak Kherson where he retired.

After the retirement he worked as a coach in Odesa, Sumy, Lviv, Kherson and Kyiv. In 1962 he was appointed the manager of FC Avangard (Zhyoltyye Vody).

Honours

Team 
      Silver medallist of the USSR Championship: 1936 (Spring)
      Bronze medallist of the Soviet Union Championship: 1937
      Ukrainian SSR Cup champion: 1937, 1938
      Champion of the Ukrainian SSR: 1936
      Silver medallist of the Russian Soviet Federative Socialist Republic: 1934

Personal 
 The best scorer of the USSR championship: 1938 (19)

Remembrance 

In September 1964, the Presidium of the Supreme Soviet of the USSR awarded Honcharenko the Medal for Battle Merit.

1997 deaths
1912 births
Footballers from Kyiv
People from Kievsky Uyezd
Soviet footballers
Ukrainian footballers
FC Dynamo Kyiv players
FC Lokomotyv Kyiv players
FC Chornomorets Odesa players
FC Krystal Kherson players
FC Tekstilshchik Ivanovo players
Soviet Top League players
Soviet First League players
Soviet football managers
Ukrainian football managers
Association football forwards